Sybil Brintrup Kruger (1954 – 12 August 2020) was a Chilean conceptual artist who worked with both traditional and digital media.

Early life 
Brintrup was born in Puerto Montt, Chile in 1954. She received a BA degree in painting from the Catholic University of Santiago in 1978. In 2004 she became a professor of art at the Pontificia Universidad Católica de Chile.

The youngest daughter of three brothers, she lived during her childhood, until the age of five, in the vicinity of the town of Fresia, Llanquihue. Shortly after her fifth birthday, she moved with her family to the town of Puerto Varas. At the age of 17, she entered the Catholic University of Santiago in the career of education, but after four years of studies she decided to pursue a career in the Arts by studying for a Bachelor of Arts with a mention in painting, from which she graduated in 1978.

During the years 1979–80, in the middle of the dictatorship, she attended the Taller de Artes Visuales (TAV) organized by Francisco Brugnoli which focused on the specialization of engraving techniques and discussion of art in general.

Academic life 
In 1978, she graduated from the Catholic University of Santiago with a degree in arts. After that, she worked as a teacher of enamel and glaze on metal for a while. Until 1994, she dedicated herself to artistic reflection, to enter Santo Tomás University, design school as a teacher of color, development of creativity and perception.

In 2004 she entered the School of Arts of the Pontificia Universidad Católica de Chile as a professor of color, video and performance where she practiced until her death in August 2020.

Collections
Brintrup's work is included in the collections of the National Gallery of Canada, the Hammer Museum and the Museum of Modern Art in Santiago, Chile.

References

1954 births
2020 deaths
20th-century Chilean women artists
21st-century Chilean women artists
People from Puerto Montt
Academic staff of the Pontifical Catholic University of Chile
Pontifical Catholic University of Chile alumni
20th-century Chilean artists
21st-century Chilean artists